During the 1962–63 Milan Associazione Calcio competed in Serie A, Coppa Italia, European Cup and Friendship Cup.

Summary 
Before the starting of the season "Associazione Calcio Milan" changed its denomination to "Milan Associazione Calcio"  and moved its headquarters away from via Andegari 4 to via Gaetano Donizetti 24. During the 1962–63 season the players to reinforce the team were Peruvian defender Víctor Benítez, from Boca Juniors, midfielder Giuliano Fortunato, from Lanerossi Vicenza, right winger Bruno Mora, from Juventus, in exchange for Sandro Salvadore, and Brazilian forward José Germano, the first ever black footballer to play in Italy, loaned out to Genoa after few weeks.

In Serie A the team finished in a decent third place, 6 points behind champions Inter. Meanwhile in the Coppa Italia the club was defeated in the round of 16.

However, the club made history in the European Cup. The first round against Union Luxembourg was cleared by the squad with a famous 14–0 aggregate scoreline, with Altafini scoring five goals in the second match of the series. In the round of 16, the next rivals were English champions Ipswich Town, defeated thanks to a 3–0 home score, followed by a 2-1 defeat in England. In the quarterfinals Turkish squad Galatasaray was defeated in both matches and also Scottish team Dundee F.C. with aggregate scores of 8–1 and 5–2 respectively.

In the 1963 European Cup Final the rival was Sport Lisboa e Benfica, back-to-back champions the previous two seasons, ina match played at Wembley Stadium. The squad closed the first half of the match with a 1-0 defeat thanks to a superb bicycle-kick goal from Eusébio. In the second half Altafini, with a pass from Rivera, scored two times against Portuguese goalkeeper Costa Pereira. Captain Cesare Maldini lifted the European Cup trophy. Also, Milan was the first Italian club to win the tournament and the third ever, after Real Madrid and Benfica after seven editions.

Altafini was the topscorer of the competition with a record of 14 goals, not surpassed until 2003 by Ruud van Nistelrooy and in 2012 by Lionel Messi, which was only broken during the 2013–14 season by Cristiano Ronaldo, who managed 17 goals.

After nine years President Andrea Rizzoli left the club to Felice Riva with four league titles and one Latin Cup in the trophy room. Also, he erected Milanello, the training clubhouse in the province of Varese. Manager Nereo Rocco left the club and signed an agreement with Torino.

Squad 

 (Captain)
 (vice-Captain)

Transfers

Competitions

Serie A

League table

Matches

Coppa Italia

Round of 32

Eightfinals

European Cup

Round of 32

Round of 16

Quarter-finals

Semi-finals

Final

Friendship Cup

Quarter-finals

Semi-finals

Final

Statistics

Squad statistics

Players statistics

See also 
 A.C. Milan

References

Bibliography

External links 

A.C. Milan seasons
Milan
UEFA Champions League-winning seasons